General Land Office Easements (also known as "government land office easements," and "GLO easements") were legal mechanisms which created right of way to ensure future access through, and to the interior of, lots or parcels created by the U.S. Small Tract Act of 1938, (52 Stat. 609, amended 1948, 62 Stat. 476; Not to be confused with the much later "Small Tracts Act" of 2002 which is applicable to handling and disposal of National Forest lands by the US Forest Service. The National Forests Small Tracts Act was amended in 2005, and/or 2015).

Lou Bellisi of PublicLands.org writes:

Small tract land patents were granted by the General Land Office (which merged with the United States Grazing Service in 1946 to form the US Bureau of Land Management). These patents transferred property owned by the U.S. government to private ownership.

Like the Homestead Acts before it, the Small Tract Act created many problems. Among them were, according to Bellisi, the

As private owners of tracts patented to them by the GLO have subdivided and developed parcels of land, GLO easements continue to create controversy. For example, a recent application to develop land for a charter school in Scottsdale, Arizona sought abandonment by the City of Scottsdale of its municipal interests in a GLO easement through the subject property (which is done without referencing any adjacent property owners' purported rights to the easement). The developer threatened to sue the city if the abandonment was not granted.

Previous GLO easement-related controversies have erupted between adjoining private landowners; and between private landowners and municipalities.

The City of Scottsdale has stated its position on these issues in many GLO easement abandonment actions by the City Council:

The City of Scottsdale does not appear to have a position or policy on the monetary value of its interests in these easements, or the abandonment thereof.

Pima County, Arizona has a policy that includes:

Scottsdale resident, property owner, and GLO easement activist Leon Spiro has frequently lectured the Scottsdale city council and state agencies in opposition to abandonment of GLO easements. Spiro has argued that the city's abandonment of the city's interest in GLO easements does not abandon the interests of adjacent landowners, for whom the easements were created.

Mr. Spiro says,

Cave Creek, Arizona attorney Noel Hebets has also opined on these issues.

Mr. Hebets writes:

The League of Arizona Cities and Towns opposed a 2011 effort by State Representative Jack Harper (R. Surprise, AZ) to require,

References

Surveying of the United States